Highway 9 is an Iraqi highway which extends from Karbala, through Al Najaf, to Al-Qādisiyyah.

Roads in Iraq